Loni Assembly constituency is one of the 403 constituencies of the Uttar Pradesh Legislative Assembly, India. It is a part of the Ghaziabad district and one of the five assembly constituencies in the Ghaziabad Lok Sabha constituency. First election in this assembly constituency was held in 2012 after the "Delimitation of Parliamentary and Assembly Constituencies Order, 2008" was passed and the constituency was constituted in 2008. The constituency is assigned identification number 53.
Loni Vidhan Sabha is mostly Gurjar and Muslims dominated, with over 100000 and 150000 votes. Other castes are also present in Loni.

Wards / Areas
Extent of Loni Assembly constituency is PCs Agraula, Lutfullapur Nawada, Badshahpur Sirauli, Aurangabad Ristal, Shakalpura, Behta Hajipur, Pachaira, Chirori, Ganouli, Pavisadakpur, Meerpur Hindu, Asalatpur (Farookh Nagar), Sirora Salempur, Loni, Banthla, Mandaula, Nistauli, Sharfuddinpur Jawali of Loni KC, Rampark Extn. Ilayachipur 0 km distance from Delhi, Tronica City (Trans Delhi signature City) Upsidc & Loni NP of Ghaziabad Tehsil, resident of popular Rti activist Mr. Saurabh Shukla.

Members of Legislative Assembly

Election Results

2022

2017

2012

See also
Ghaziabad district, India
Ghaziabad Lok Sabha constituency
Sixteenth Legislative Assembly of Uttar Pradesh
Uttar Pradesh Legislative Assembly

References

External links
 

Assembly constituencies of Uttar Pradesh
Ghaziabad district, India
Constituencies established in 2008
2008 establishments in Uttar Pradesh